Peter Amos Mbiko Siwo ( – ) He was born in Siwo Village beside the Thandiwe Caves, near Chipata in Eastern Province. He was a pupil at Munali Boys Secondary School, Lusaka and became Head Boy, at that time it was the only secondary school for black boys in the then Northern Rhodesia.

He was one of the first black graduates in Northern Rhodesia, and a pioneering civil servant after the country achieved independence as Zambia.

He did his postgraduate studies at Columbia University, in New York.

He was the first black graduate to work at the Luansha Mines. Before independence, he lived in  a little house in no man's land in the Copperbelt. They did not want to put him with the black miners in those tiny houses because he was a graduate, but they could not put him in a big house in the white area either because he was black.

He was the first chairman of Zambia Airways. He was Permanent Secretary in the then Ministry of Power, Transport Works and Communications for about five years when UDI was declared.  After he left they split it into three different ministries.

He chaired many meetings for United Nations Education committees and Commonwealth Education Conferences and World Bank meetings.  He chaired and worked on the Education Reforms in Zambia and was the first Director of Examinations Board.

He married Sheila Gibson McHarrie at Glenluce Abbey, Wigtownshire, Scotland on 20 September 1979.

He was often quoted by Times of Zambia.
He studied at St Antony's College, Oxford University 1982-83.

1931 births
1998 deaths
20th-century Zambian businesspeople
People from Eastern Province, Zambia
Columbia University alumni
Alumni of St Antony's College, Oxford
Alumni of Munali Secondary School